The Musical Theatre Academy (The MTA) was a drama college based in Islington, London. Founded in 2009, the school closed at the end of the 2021–2022 academic year. The principal, Annemarie Lewis Thomas, announced that students in their final term would still graduate and the other students would be helped to find places in other institutions.

College History 
The MTA opened in 2009 by Annemarie Lewis Thomas running the UK's first accelerated learning programme in "triple threat" (acting, dancing and singing) training. It was also the only UK Musical Theatre college to split its acting focus between stage and screen. In 2012, it was awarded The Stage Award of School of the Year in 2012, who named them "a new force in drama training." In 2017 The MTA was once again named as The Stage School of the Year. This time the citation commended them on the #time4change campaign, whilst acknowledging The MTA's growing influence within the training sector.

The academy was originally based at the Drill Hall (now the RADA Studios), before moving to 89  Holloway Road in 2011. In July 2015 the academy relocated to The Bernie Grant Arts Centre in Tottenham.  Students received a guarantee that their fees are spent on training, not on securing a profit, and consequently the academy was granted charitable status in 2012.

The college has been actively campaigning for better Mental Health provision within drama schools, and in 2016 hosted the #time4change conference, focussing on Mental Health within vocational colleges.  In July 2016 it launched the #time4change Mental Health charter – which has over 100 companies signed up, including the Theatre Royal Stratford East, Rose Bruford College, Mountview, plus off West End production companies, along with over 60 theatrical agencies.

Academic Year 
The course ran over 4 terms per year with 40 hours contact time per week, with classes evenly divided between all three disciplines. As a key policy all of its staff are currently working in the industry at a level of the West End (London)No 1 UK touring circuit or the equivalent in their area. It produces public performances in an established off-West End venue every term – shows to date include the world premieres of Lia's Guide to Winning The Lottery (by Keren David, Paul Herbet and Andy Kaby), In Touch (by Dougal Irvine), Dangerous Daughters, Celebs Anon, The Sunshine Gang, The Ballad of Kitty Jay, Just the Ticket and The Venus Factor (all by Nick Stimson and Annemarie Lewis Thomas), Animus (by Webborn and Finn)

The academy was the only UK college to have a core policy of supporting new writing in the UK and regularly has composers coming in to work with the students on new material, such as Chris Passey, Dougal Irvine, Tim Sutton and Laurence Mark Wythe. The MTA saw itself as a college for life, providing graduates with ongoing care, support and help. In its first 10 years (2009-2019), 100% of students had secured agent representation prior to graduating.
One of the academy's productions is Something Old, Something New – The Musical Theatre Revue'.

 Performances 
The students (as part of their training) were regularly seen in the West End in professional shows/concerts, and to date its students have backed Shoshana Bean, Patina Miller performed with Katherine Jenkins at the London Palladium, and sung on the album Lift by Craig Adams and Ian Watson. They have also provided the ensemble for the Tommy Gala at the Prince Edward Theatre, the MMD 20th anniversary Gala at the Novello, and Julie Atherton – No Space for Air'' at the Apollo Theatre. More recently the students have been seen on several episodes of The Last Leg on Channel 4.

References

External links 
 

Drama schools in London
Education in the London Borough of Islington
Educational institutions established in 2009
2009 establishments in England